is a Japanese footballer currently playing as an attacking midfielder for Shonan Bellmare.

Career statistics

Club
.

Notes

References

External links

2002 births
Living people
People from Takarazuka, Hyōgo
Association football people from Hyōgo Prefecture
Japanese footballers
Association football midfielders
J1 League players
Cerezo Osaka players
Shonan Bellmare players